Polyipnus triphanos, commonly known as the threelight hatchetfish, is a species of ray-finned fish in the family Sternoptychidae.

References

Sternoptychidae
Fish described in 1938
Taxa named by Leonard Peter Schultz